Abel Bennett Tract Historic District is a national historic district located at Binghamton in Broome County, New York.  The district includes 1,053 contributing buildings, two contributing sites, one contributing structure, and two contributing objects.

It was listed on the National Register of Historic Places in 2008.

References

Buildings and structures in Binghamton, New York
Historic districts on the National Register of Historic Places in New York (state)
Historic districts in Broome County, New York
National Register of Historic Places in Broome County, New York